The 1980 Escort Championships was an Australian rules football knock out tournament held between March and July 1980. The tournament was organised by Australian Football Championships, and was contested by teams from the Victorian Football League, South Australian National Football League and West Australian Football League, and the representative teams from New South Wales, Tasmania, Queensland and the Australian Capital Territory. The tournament was won by North Melbourne, who defeated Collingwood in the grand final.

Background
The 1980 Escort Championships was the fourth season of the national night premiership competition. The size of the competition consisted 34 teams. The competing teams were all VFL, SANFL and WAFL teams, and the representative teams from New South Wales, Tasmania, Queensland and the Australian Capital Territory.

The format for the competition was a simple knock-out tournament. Round one featured the VFL teams that finished 7th to 12th in 1979; the SANFL teams that finished 3rd to 10th in 1979; the WAFL teams that finished 3rd to 8th in 1979; plus a playoff between the four minor states.

Round two involved the teams that survived round one.

In round three, the winners of round two were joined by the VFL's top six of 1979, the SANFL's top two of 1979, and the WAFL's top two of 1979.

Matches in Rounds 1 and 2 were played in various venues across Australia. With the exception of one Round 3 match, all matches from Round 3 onwards were played at VFL Park on Tuesday nights. Matches were televised directly to Melbourne, Adelaide and Perth. The tournament was mostly played concurrently with the premiership season, although some matches in the first three rounds were played during the pre-season.

Qualified teams

1 Includes previous appearances in the Championship of Australia and NFL Night Series.

Venues

Games

Round 1

|- bgcolor="#CCCCFF"
| Home team
| Home team score
| Away team
| Away team score
| Ground
| Crowd
| Date
|- bgcolor="#FFFFFF"

| West Perth
| 11.15 (81)
| Hawthorn
| 18.13 (121)
| Perth Oval
| 
| Sunday, 2 March
|- bgcolor="#FFFFFF"
| Claremont
| 22.10 (142)
| East Perth
| 4.16 (40)
| Leederville Oval, Perth
| 
| Monday, 3 March
|- bgcolor="#FFFFFF"
| Subiaco
| 15.9 (99)
| Perth
| 11.14 (80)
| Perth Oval
|
| Monday, 3 March
|- bgcolor="#FFFFFF"
| Melbourne
| 22.16 (148)
| Swan Districts
| 8.18 (66)
| VFL Park
| 3,040
| Tuesday, 4 March
|- bgcolor="#FFFFFF"
| St Kilda
| 19.6 (120)
| Sturt
| 8.11 (59)
| VFL Park
| 6,436
| Saturday, 8 March
|- bgcolor="#FFFFFF"
| South Melbourne
| 10.16 (76)
| West Adelaide
| 7.18 (60)
| Richmond Oval, Adelaide
| 
| Saturday, 8 March
|- bgcolor="#FFFFFF"
| West Torrens
| 12.3 (75)
| Footscray
| 17.10 (112)
| VFL Park
| 2,108
| Tuesday, 11 March
|- bgcolor="#FFFFFF"
| North Adelaide
| 14.11 (95)
| Norwood
| 13.13 (91)
| Norwood Oval
| 
| Tuesday, 11 March
|- bgcolor="#FFFFFF"
| Glenelg
| 11.13 (79)
| Central District
| 6.8 (44)
| Norwood Oval
| 
| Friday, 14 March
|- bgcolor="#FFFFFF"
| Richmond
| 20.17 (137)
| Woodville
| 9.3 (57)
| VFL Park
| 5,031
| Saturday, 15 March
|- bgcolor="#FFFFFF"
| Tasmania
| 9.15 (69)
| Queensland
| 15.17 (107)
| Ulverstone, Tasmania
| 2,174
| Sunday, 16 March
|- bgcolor="#FFFFFF"
| New South Wales
| 17.10 (112)
| Australian Capital Territory
| 10.11 (71)
| McPherson Oval, North Wagga Wagga
| 3,500
| Sunday, 16 March

Round 2

|- bgcolor="#CCCCFF"
| Home team
| Home team score
| Away team
| Away team score
| Ground
| Crowd
| Date
|- bgcolor="#FFFFFF"

| Claremont
| 16.20 (116)
| Subiaco
| 12.9 (81)
| Leederville Oval, Perth
| 
| Saturday, 15 March
|- bgcolor="#FFFFFF"
| Hawthorn
| 17.17 (119)
| Melbourne
| 14.4 (88)
| VFL Park
| 6,005
| Tuesday, 18 March
|- bgcolor="#FFFFFF"
| North Adelaide
| 13.12 (90)
| Glenelg
| 22.11 (143)
| Norwood Oval
|
| Friday, 21 March
|- bgcolor="#FFFFFF"
| St Kilda
| 17.15 (117)
| South Melbourne
| 10.6 (66)
| VFL Park
| 10,308
| Saturday, 22 March
|- bgcolor="#FFFFFF"
| Footscray
| 18.14 (122)
| Queensland
| 10.8 (68)
| Windsor Park, Mayne
| 
| Sunday, 23 March
|- bgcolor="#FFFFFF"
| Richmond
| 17.19 (121)
| New South Wales
| 14.16 (100)
| Sydney Cricket Ground
|
| Sunday, 23 March

Round 3

|- bgcolor="#CCCCFF"
| Home team
| Home team score
| Away team
| Away team score
| Ground
| Crowd
| Date
|- bgcolor="#FFFFFF"
| Port Adelaide
| 12.14 (86)
| Essendon
| 18.10 (118)
| VFL Park
| 5,261
| Friday, 14 March
|- bgcolor="#FFFFFF"
| South Fremantle
| 23.19 (157)
| Carlton
| 9.12 (66)
| East Fremantle Oval, Perth
| 6,000
| Sunday, 16 March
|- bgcolor="#FFFFFF"
| Claremont
| 10.13 (73)
| Geelong
| 9.14 (68)
| VFL Park
| 3,783
| Tuesday, 25 March
|- bgcolor="#FFFFFF"
| Hawthorn
| 20.20 (140)
| East Fremantle
| 4.11 (35)
| VFL Park
| 2,919
| Tuesday, 1 April
|- bgcolor="#FFFFFF"
| Glenelg
| 9.11 (65)
| North Melbourne
| 9.16 (70)
| VFL Park
| 4,419
| Tuesday, 15 April
|- bgcolor="#FFFFFF"
| St Kilda
| 16.11 (107)
| South Adelaide
| 13.11 (89)
| VFL Park
| 3,594
| Tuesday, 29 April
|- bgcolor="#FFFFFF"
| Footscray
| 11.9 (75)
| Collingwood
| 18.13 (121)
| VFL Park
| 9,995
| Tuesday, 6 May
|- bgcolor="#FFFFFF"
| Richmond
| 16.13 (109)
| Fitzroy
| 13.12 (90)
| VFL Park
| 10,626
| Tuesday, 13 May

Quarter-finals

|- bgcolor="#CCCCFF"
| Home team
| Home team score
| Away team
| Away team score
| Ground
| Crowd
| Date
|- bgcolor="#FFFFFF"
| Claremont
| 12.12 (84)
| Hawthorn
| 7.10 (52)
| VFL Park
| 5,326
| Tuesday, 20 May
|- bgcolor="#FFFFFF"
| North Melbourne
| 18.11 (119)
| St Kilda
| 13.11 (89)
| VFL Park
| 6,223
| Tuesday, 27 May
|- bgcolor="#FFFFFF"
| Collingwood
| 10.14 (74)
| Richmond
| 5.13 (43)
| VFL Park
| 17,950
| Tuesday, 3 June
|- bgcolor="#FFFFFF"
| Essendon
| 12.14 (86)
| South Fremantle
| 6.11 (47)
| VFL Park
| 4,060
| Tuesday, 10 June

Semi-finals

|- bgcolor="#CCCCFF"
| Home team
| Home team score
| Away team
| Away team score
| Ground
| Crowd
| Date
|- bgcolor="#FFFFFF"
| North Melbourne
| 15.10 (100)
| Claremont
| 9.9 (63)
| VFL Park
| 4,299
| Tuesday, 24 June
|- bgcolor="#FFFFFF"
| Collingwood
| 15.10 (100)
| Essendon
| 12.9 (81)
| VFL Park
| 16,527
| Tuesday, 1 July

Grand final

|- bgcolor="#CCCCFF"
| Home team
| Home team score
| Away team
| Away team score
| Ground
| Crowd
| Date
|- bgcolor="#FFFFFF"
| North Melbourne
| 8.9 (57)
| Collingwood
| 7.12 (54)
| VFL Park
| 50,478
| Tuesday, 15 July

Notable events
The competition sponsor at the time was the cigarette manufacturer W.D. & H.O. Wills – "Escort" was a brand name used by the company at the time.
The total prizemoney was $400,000, with the winners North Melbourne winning $64,000.
The grand final ended in controversy. Collingwood led by three points when the final siren sounded, but field umpire Ian Robinson was unable to hear it, and allowed play to continue for several seconds; indeed, many players were unable to hear the siren, although many could and some Collingwood players were already celebrating the victory. In the ensuing play, North Melbourne's Malcolm Blight passed the ball forward to Kerry Good, who marked and then kicked a goal after the final siren to secure victory for North Melbourne. To minimize the risk of a repeated incident, VFL umpires wore portable electronic beepers during the finals of the premiership season.

See also
List of Australian Football League night premiers
1980 VFL season

References

External links
 1980 AFC Escort Championships - detailed review including quarter-by-quarter scores, best players and goalkickers for each match

Australian rules football competitions in Australia
1980 in Australian rules football